Myochamidae is a family of saltwater clams, marine bivalves in the order Anomalodesmata.

Genera
Genera within the family Myochamidae:

 Hunkydora Fleming, 1948 
 Myadora Gray, 1840 
 Myadoropsis Habe, 1960
 Myochama Stutchbury, 1830

References

 
 Powell A. W. B., New Zealand Mollusca, William Collins Publishers Ltd, Auckland, New Zealand 1979 
 Glen Pownall, New Zealand Shells and Shellfish, Seven Seas Publishing Pty Ltd, Wellington, New Zealand 1979 

 
Bivalve families